Prince of Wales is a Canadian rural community in Saint John County, New Brunswick. It is located just west of the city of Saint John.

History

The community was settled in 1783 by Loyalist Lieutenant Colonel Gabriel DeVeber, who was a member of the Prince of Wales American Regiment (PoWAR). The PoWAR fought in the American Revolutionary War. The community was a farming and lumbering community in the 19th century. The Shore Line Railway ran through the community, which has since been abandoned.

Notable people

See also
List of communities in New Brunswick

References
 
 The New Brunswick Military Heritage Project
 Loyalist Institute
 Provincial Archives of New Brunswick
 Geographical Names of Canada - Prince of Wales

Communities in Saint John County, New Brunswick